Dominguez Butte is a 4,476-foot (1,364 meter) elevation sandstone summit located south of Lake Powell, in San Juan County of southern Utah. Dominguez Butte has a brief appearance in the 1968 film Planet of the Apes, when a spaceship crash lands in Lake Powell.

Geology
Dominguez Butte is a butte composed primarily of Entrada Sandstone, similar to Padres Butte  to the north, and Boundary Butte  to the south. The Entrada Sandstone overlays Carmel Formation, and below that Page Sandstone at lake level. Above the Entrada layers is Romana Sandstone capped by Morrison Formation. It is located in the southern edge of the Great Basin Desert on the Colorado Plateau. Precipitation runoff from this feature drains into the Colorado River watershed.

History
Francisco Atanasio Domínguez (1740–1805) was a Franciscan missionary and explorer who led the 1776 Domínguez–Escalante expedition. Guided by local Native Americans, the expedition attempted to cross the Colorado River at Lee's Ferry, but found it too difficult. A second ford of the Colorado River, named the Crossing of the Fathers, was successfully made two miles north of Dominguez Butte on November 7, 1776. The descent to the crossing was so treacherous that they had to carve steps into the stone to ensure the livestock could make it down to the river. Today, this ford lies beneath Lake Powell.
 
This butte's name was officially adopted in 1976 by the U.S. Board on Geographic Names to commemorate Atanacio Domínguez.

Gallery

Climate

According to the Köppen climate classification system, Dominguez Butte is located in an arid climate zone with hot, very dry summers, and chilly winters with very little snow. Spring and fall are the most favorable seasons to visit.

See also
 Colorado Plateau
 List of rock formations in the United States

References

External links

 Weather forecast: Dominguez Butte

Colorado Plateau
Landforms of San Juan County, Utah
Geography of the Navajo Nation
Glen Canyon National Recreation Area
Lake Powell
Buttes of Utah
North American 1000 m summits
Sandstone formations of the United States